The Saudi Comic Con, a comic book and pop culture convention held in Saudi Arabia. It is the country's first comic-con.

History

Inauguration
Inaugurated in 2017, the comic book convention was organised by local company Time Entertainment; it was held over three days in February 2017 in Jeddah. Unusually for an event sponsored by the government's General Entertainment Authority, under the aegis of the Saudi Vision 2030 program to diversify the economy the genders were allowed to mingle and cosplay (albeit crossplaying is prohibited), which is unheard of in a nation where segregation of the sexes is pivotal.

A hashtag denoting it as a "devil-worshipping" festival became popular on Twitter, however, and there were calls for a boycott. Nonetheless the convention was popular, and included both national and international talent: Charles Dance and Julian Glover from Game of Thrones, Giancarlo Esposito from Breaking Bad, Mads Mikkelsen from Doctor Strange, and assorted Saudi producers and actors, including cast members from the upcoming Saudi superhero show Mas'hour (meaning "Bewitched" in Arabic) appeared on panels.

20,000 people attended the inauguration, and the event was noted both for being a recognition of the importance of anime and pop culture in Saudi Arabia, and for giving a platform to local artists and the national entertainment industry in the global economy.

References

External links 

 
 YouTube news coverage

Annual events in Saudi Arabia
Comics conventions
Festivals in Saudi Arabia
Multigenre conventions
Recurring events established in 2017